The Havana Invitational was a pro-am golf tournament held from 1948 to 1958. It was played at Havana Country Club in Havana, Cuba. In 1958 a second unrelated event was held two weeks before the pro-am, the Havana International. This was held at the Villa Real Golf Club.

The 1948 event was a 54 hole event played from Monday 13 December to Wednesday 15 December immediately after the Miami Open which had finished on 12 December. Sam Snead won the individual event with a score of 209 and also won the best-ball with a score of 193. Later events were part of the PGA schedule.

Winners

Notes

References

Golf tournaments in Cuba